Helge Emil Pukema (April 8, 1917 – December 20, 2004) was an American football player.  He played college football for the Minnesota Golden Gophers football team and was selected by the Newspaper Enterprise Association as a first-team guard on the 1940 College Football All-America Team. He died in Billings Park, Wisconsin, in 2004 at age 87.

Head coaching record

References

External links
 

1917 births
2004 deaths
American football guards
Minnesota Golden Gophers football players
St. Olaf Oles football coaches
People from Bessemer, Michigan
Players of American football from Michigan